Pumped-storage hydroelectricity (PSH), or pumped hydroelectric energy storage (PHES), is a type of hydroelectric energy storage used by electric power systems for load balancing.  The method stores energy in the form of gravitational potential energy of water, pumped from a lower elevation reservoir to a higher elevation. Low-cost surplus off-peak electric power is typically used to run the pumps. During periods of high electrical demand, the stored water is released through turbines to produce electric power. Although the losses of the pumping process make the plant a net consumer of energy overall, the system increases revenue by selling more electricity during periods of peak demand, when electricity prices are highest. If the upper lake collects significant rainfall or is fed by a river then the plant may be a net energy producer in the manner of a traditional hydroelectric plant.

Pumped-storage hydroelectricity allows energy from intermittent sources (such as solar, wind) and other renewables, or excess electricity from continuous base-load sources (such as coal or nuclear) to be saved for periods of higher demand. The reservoirs used with pumped storage are quite small when compared to conventional hydroelectric dams of similar power capacity, and generating periods are often less than half a day.

Pumped storage is by far the largest-capacity form of grid energy storage available, and, as of 2020, the United States Department of Energy Global Energy Storage Database reports that PSH accounts for around 95% of all active tracked storage installations worldwide, with a total installed throughput capacity of over 181 GW, of which about 29 GW are in the United States, and a total installed storage capacity of over 1.6 TWh, of which about 250 GWh are in the United States. The round-trip energy efficiency of PSH varies between 70%–80%, with some sources claiming up to 87%. The main disadvantage of PSH is the specialist nature of the site required, needing both geographical height and water availability. Suitable sites are therefore likely to be in hilly or mountainous regions, and potentially in areas of natural beauty, making PSH susceptible to social and ecological issues. Many recently proposed projects, at least in the U.S., avoid highly sensitive or scenic areas, and some propose to take advantage of "brownfield" locations such as disused mines.

Overview

Basic principle

At times of low electrical demand, excess generation capacity is used to pump water into the upper reservoir. When there is higher demand, water is released back into the lower reservoir through a turbine, generating electricity. Reversible turbine/generator assemblies act as a combined pump and turbine generator unit (usually a Francis turbine design). Variable speed  operation further optimize the round trip efficiency in pumped hydro storage plants.
In micro-PSH applications, a group of pumps and Pump As Turbine (PAT) could be implemented respectively for pumping and generating phases. The same pump could be used in both modes by changing rotational direction and speed: the operation point in pumping usually differs from the operation point in PAT mode.

Types: natural or man-made reservoirs
In open-loop systems, pure pumped-storage plants store water in an upper reservoir with no natural inflows, while pump-back plants utilize a combination of pumped storage and conventional hydroelectric plants with an upper reservoir that is replenished in part by natural inflows from a stream or river. Plants that do not use pumped-storage are referred to as conventional hydroelectric plants; conventional hydroelectric plants that have significant storage capacity may be able to play a similar role in the electrical grid as pumped storage by deferring output until needed.

Economic efficiency
Taking into account evaporation losses from the exposed water surface and conversion losses, energy recovery of 70–80% or more can be achieved. This technique is currently the most cost-effective means of storing large amounts of electrical energy, but capital costs and the presence of appropriate geography are critical decision factors in selecting pumped-storage plant sites.

The relatively low energy density of pumped storage systems requires either large flows and/or large differences in height between reservoirs. The only way to store a significant amount of energy is by having a large body of water located relatively near, but as high above as possible, a second body of water. In some places this occurs naturally, in others one or both bodies of water were man-made. Projects in which both reservoirs are artificial and in which no natural inflows are involved with either reservoir are referred to as "closed loop" systems.

These systems may be economical because they flatten out load variations on the power grid, permitting thermal power stations such as coal-fired plants and nuclear power plants that provide base-load electricity to continue operating at peak efficiency, while reducing the need for "peaking" power plants that use the same fuels as many base-load thermal plants, gas and oil, but have been designed for flexibility rather than maximal efficiency. Hence pumped storage systems are crucial when coordinating large groups of heterogeneous generators. Capital costs for pumped-storage plants are relatively high, although this is somewhat mitigated by their proven long service life of decades - and in some cases over a century, which is three to five times longer than utility-scale batteries. When Electricity prices become negative, pumped hydro operators may earn twice - when "buying" the electricity to pump the water to the upper reservoir at negative spot prices and again when selling the electricity at a later time when prices are high.

Along with energy management, pumped storage systems help control electrical network frequency and provide reserve generation. Thermal plants are much less able to respond to sudden changes in electrical demand, potentially causing frequency and voltage instability. Pumped storage plants, like other hydroelectric plants, can respond to load changes within seconds.

The most important use for pumped storage has traditionally been to balance baseload powerplants, but may also be used to abate the fluctuating output of intermittent energy sources. Pumped storage provides a load at times of high electricity output and low electricity demand, enabling additional system peak capacity. In certain jurisdictions, electricity prices may be close to zero or occasionally negative on occasions that there is more electrical generation available than there is load available to absorb it; although at present this is rarely due to wind or solar power alone, increased wind and solar generation will increase the likelihood of such occurrences. It is particularly likely that pumped storage will become especially important as a balance for very large scale photovoltaic generation. Increased long distance transmission capacity combined with significant amounts of energy storage will be a crucial part of regulating any large-scale deployment of intermittent renewable power sources.  The high non-firm renewable electricity penetration in some regions  supplies 40% of annual output, but 60% may be reached before additional storage is necessary.

Small-scale facilities
Smaller pumped storage plants cannot achieve the same economies of scale as larger ones, but some do exist, including a recent 13 MW project in Germany. Shell Energy has proposed a 5 MW project in Washington State. Some have proposed small pumped storage plants in buildings, although these are not yet economical. Also, it is difficult to fit large reservoirs into the urban landscape. Nevertheless, some authors defend the technological simplicity and security of water supply as important externalities.

History 

The first use of pumped storage was in 1907 in Switzerland, at the Engeweiher pumped storage facility near Schaffhausen, Switzerland. In the 1930s reversible hydroelectric turbines became available. These turbines could operate as both turbine-generators and in reverse as electric motor driven pumps. The latest in large-scale engineering technology are variable speed machines for greater efficiency. These machines operate in synchronization with the network frequency when generating, but operate asynchronously (independent of the network frequency) when pumping.

Worldwide use 

In 2009, world pumped storage generating capacity was 104 GW, while other sources claim 127 GW, which comprises the vast majority of all types of utility grade electric storage. The EU had 38.3 GW net capacity (36.8% of world capacity) out of a total of 140 GW of hydropower and representing 5% of total net electrical capacity in the EU. Japan had 25.5 GW net capacity (24.5% of world capacity).

In 2010 the United States had 21.5 GW of pumped storage generating capacity (20.6% of world capacity). PSH contributed 21,073 GWh of energy  in 2020 in the United States, but −5,321 GWh  (net) because more energy is consumed in pumping than is generated. Nameplate pumped storage capacity had grown to 21.6 GW by 2014, with pumped storage comprising 97% of grid-scale energy storage in the United States. As of late 2014, there were 51 active project proposals with a total of 39 GW of new nameplate capacity across all stages of the FERC licensing process for new pumped storage hydroelectric plants in the United States, but no new plants were currently under construction in the United States at the time.

The five largest operational pumped-storage plants are listed below (for a detailed list see List of pumped-storage hydroelectric power stations):

Australia 
In June 2018 the Australian federal government announced that 14 sites had been identified in Tasmania for pumped storage hydro, with the potential of adding 4.8GW to the national grid if a second interconnector beneath Bass Strait was constructed.

Approvals have been granted for the Snowy 2.0 project, which will link two existing dams in the New South Wales Snowy Mountains to provide 2,000 MW of capacity and 350,000 MWh of storage.

In September 2022, a pumped hydro electric storage (PHES) scheme was announced at Pioneer-Burdekin in central Queensland which has the potential to be the largest PHES in the world at 5GW.

Norway 
There are 9 power stations capable of pumping with a total installed capacity of 1344 MW and an average annual production of 2247 GWh. The pumped storage hydro power in Norway is built a bit different than the rest of the world. They are designed for seasonal pumping. Most of them can also not cycle the water endlessly, but only pump and reuse once. The reason for this is the design of the tunnels and elevation of lower and upper reservoir. Some, like Nygard power station, pump water from several river intakes up to a reservoir.

The largest one, Saurdal, which is part of the Ulla-Førre complex, have four 160 MW Francis turbines, but only two are reversible. The lower reservoir is at higher elevation than the station itself, and thus the water pumped up can only be used once before it has to flow to the next station, Kvilldal, further down the tunnel system. And in addition to the lower reservoir it will receive water that can be pumped up from 23 river/stream and small reservoir intakes. Some which have already gone through a smaller power station on its way.

Pump-back hydroelectric dams
Conventional hydroelectric dams may also make use of pumped storage in a hybrid system that both generates power from water naturally flowing into the reservoir as well as storing water pumped back to the reservoir from below the dam. The Grand Coulee Dam in the United States was expanded with a pump-back system in 1973. Existing dams may be repowered with reversing turbines thereby extending the length of time the plant can operate at capacity. Optionally a pump back powerhouse such as the Russell Dam (1992) may be added to a dam for increased generating capacity. Making use of an existing dam's upper reservoir and transmission system can expedite projects and reduce costs.

In January 2019, the State Grid Corporation of China announced plans to invest US$5.7 billion in five pumped hydro storage plants with a total 6 GW capacity, to be located in Hebei, Jilin, Zhejiang, Shandong provinces, and in Xinjiang Autonomous Region. China is seeking to build 40 GW of pumped hydro capacity installed by 2020.

Potential technologies

Seawater
Pumped storage plants can operate with seawater, although there are additional challenges compared to using fresh water, such as saltwater corrosion and barnacle growth. Inaugurated in 1966, the 240 MW Rance tidal power station in France can partially work as a pumped-storage station. When high tides occur at off-peak hours, the turbines can be used to pump more seawater into the reservoir than the high tide would have naturally brought in. It is the only large-scale power plant of its kind.

In 1999, the 30 MW Yanbaru project in Okinawa was the first demonstration of seawater pumped storage. It has since been decommissioned. A 300 MW seawater-based Lanai Pumped Storage Project was considered for Lanai, Hawaii, and seawater-based projects have been proposed in Ireland. A pair of proposed projects in the Atacama Desert in northern Chile would use 600 MW of photovoltaic solar (Skies of Tarapacá) together with 300 MW of pumped storage (Mirror of Tarapacá) raising seawater  up a coastal cliff.

Underground reservoirs
The use of underground reservoirs has been investigated. Recent examples include the proposed Summit project in Norton, Ohio, the proposed Maysville project in Kentucky (underground limestone mine), and the Mount Hope project in New Jersey, which was to have used a former iron mine as the lower reservoir. The proposed energy storage at the Callio site in Pyhäjärvi (Finland) would utilize the deepest base metal mine in Europe, with  elevation difference. Several new underground pumped storage projects have been proposed. Cost-per-kilowatt estimates for these projects can be lower than for surface projects if they use existing underground mine space. There are limited opportunities involving suitable underground space, but the number of underground pumped storage opportunities may increase if abandoned coal mines prove suitable.

In Bendigo, Victoria, Australia, the Bendigo Sustainability Group has proposed the use of the old gold mines under Bendigo for Pumped Hydro Energy Storage.  Bendigo has the greatest concentration of deep shaft hard rock mines anywhere in the world with over 5,000 shafts sunk under Bendigo in the second half of the 19th Century.  The deepest shaft extends 1,406 metres vertically underground.  A recent pre-feasibility study has shown the concept to be viable with a generation capacity of 30 MW and a run time of 6 hours using a water head of over 750 metres.

US-based start-up Quidnet Energy is exploring using abandoned oil and gas wells for pumped-storage. If successful, they hope to scale up to using many or most of the 3 million abandoned wells in the US.

Decentralised systems
Small (or micro) applications for pumped-storage could be built on streams and within infrastructures, such as drinking water networks and artificial snow making infrastructures. In this regard, a storm-water basin has been concretely implemented as a cost-effective solution for a water reservoir in a micro pumped hydro energy storage. Such plants provide distributed energy storage and distributed flexible electricity production and can contribute to the decentralized integration of intermittent renewable energy technologies, such as wind power and solar power. Reservoirs that can be used for small pumped-storage hydropower plants could include natural or artificial lakes, reservoirs within other structures such as irrigation, or unused portions of mines or underground military installations. In Switzerland one study suggested that the total installed capacity of small pumped-storage hydropower plants in 2011 could be increased by 3 to 9 times by providing adequate policy instruments.

Underwater reservoirs

In March 2017 the research project StEnSea (Storing Energy at Sea) announced their successful completion of a four-week test of a pumped storage underwater reservoir. In this configuration a hollow sphere submerged and anchored at great depth acts as the lower reservoir, while the upper reservoir is the enclosing body of water. Electricity is created when water is let in via a reversible turbine integrated into the sphere. During off-peak hours the turbine changes direction and pumps the water out again, using "surplus" electricity from the grid. The quantity of power created when water is let in grows proportionally to the height of the column of water above the sphere, in other words: the deeper the sphere is located, the more densely it can store energy.
As such the energy storage capacity of the submerged reservoir is not governed by the gravitational energy in the traditional sense, but rather by the vertical pressure variation.

While StEnSea's test took place at a depth of 100 m in the fresh water Lake Constance, the technology is foreseen to be used in salt water at greater depths. Since the submerged reservoir needs only a connecting electrical cable, the depth at which it can be employed is limited only by the depth at which the turbine can function, currently limited to 700 m. The challenge of designing salt water pumped storage in this underwater configuration brings a range of advantages:
 No land area is required,
 No mechanical structure other than the electrical cable needs to span the distance of the potential energy difference,
 In the presence of sufficient seabed area multiple reservoirs can scale the storage capacity without limits,
 Should a reservoir collapse, the consequences would be limited apart from the loss of the reservoir itself,
 Evaporation from the upper reservoir has no effect on the energy conversion efficiency,
 Transmission of electricity between the reservoir and the grid can be established from a nearby offshore wind farm limiting transmission loss and obviating the need for onshore cabling permits.

A current commercial design featuring a sphere with an inner diameter of 30 m submerged to 700 m would correspond to a 20 MWh capacity which with a 5 MW turbine would lead to a 4-hour discharge time. An energy park with multiple such reservoirs would bring the storage cost to around a few eurocents per kWh with construction and equipment costs in the range €1,200-€1,400 per kW. To avoid excessive transmission cost and loss, the reservoirs should be placed off deep water coasts of densely populated areas, such as Norway, Spain, United States and Japan. With this limitation the concept would allow for worldwide electricity storage of close to 900 GWh.

For comparison, a traditional, gravity-based pumped storage capable of storing 20 MWh in a water reservoir the size of a 30 m sphere would need a hydraulic head of 519 m with the elevation spanned by a pressurized water pipe requiring typically a hill or mountain for support.

Home use
Using a pumped-storage system of cisterns and small generators, pico hydro may also be effective for "closed loop" home energy generation systems.

Fracking
Using hydraulic fracturing pressure can be stored underground in strata such as shale. The shale used contains no hydrocarbons.

See also 

 Compressed-air energy storage
 Gravity battery
 Hydropower
 Tide mill
 List of energy storage power plants

References

External links 

 
 Global pumped hydro atlas, with over 600K potential sites

Dams
Energy storage
 
Water conservation
Swiss inventions

it:Centrale idroelettrica#Centrali con impianti ad accumulazione
Grid energy storage